Events in the year 1996 in the Republic of India.

Incumbents
 President of India – Shankar Dayal Sharma
 Prime Minister of India – P. V. Narasimha Rao until 16 May, Atal Bihari Vajpayee until 1 June, H. D. Deve Gowda
 Chief Justice of India – Aziz Mushabber Ahmadi

Governors
 Andhra Pradesh – Krishan Kant 
 Arunachal Pradesh – Mata Prasad 
 Assam – Loknath Mishra 
 Bihar – Akhlaqur Rahman Kidwai
 Goa – Romesh Bhandari (until 18 July), P.C. Alexander (starting 18 July)
 Gujarat – Naresh Chandra (until 1 March), Krishna Pal Singh (starting 1 March)
 Haryana – Mahabir Prasad 
 Himachal Pradesh – Sheila Kaul (until 22 April), Mahabir Prasad (starting 22 April)
 Jammu and Kashmir – K. V. Krishna Rao 
 Karnataka – Khurshed Alam Khan 
 Kerala – P. Shiv Shankar (until 1 May), Khurshid Alam Khan (starting 5 May) 
 Madhya Pradesh – Mohammad Shafi Qureshi 
 Maharashtra – P.C. Alexander 
 Manipur – O. N. Shrivastava 
 Meghalaya – M.M. Jacob 
 Mizoram – P. R. Kyndiah 
 Nagaland – O. N. Shrivastava (until 12 November), Om Prakash Sharma (starting 12 November)
 Odisha – Gopala Ramanujam 
 Punjab – Bakshi Krishan Nath Chhibber
 Rajasthan – Bali Ram Bhagat
 Sikkim – K. V. Raghunatha Reddy (until 9 February), Chaudhary Randhir Singh (starting 10 February) 
 Tamil Nadu – Marri Chenna Reddy (until 2 December), Krishan Kant (starting 2 December) 
 Tripura – Siddheswar Prasad  
 Uttar Pradesh – 
 until 3 May: Motilal Vora
 3 May-19 July: Mohammad Shafi Qureshi 
 starting 19 July: Romesh Bhandari
 West Bengal – K. V. Raghunatha Reddy

Events
 National income - 13,948,160 million
 January – A corruption scandal erupts that alleged many senior politicians and civil servants to have received bribes from prominent businessman Surendra Jain.
 January – Tensions with Pakistan rise sharply and there is an exchange of mortar and machine-gun fire across the Line of Control in Kashmir.
 29 January – S. R. Bommai resigns as president of the Janata Dal party and is replaced by Laloo Prasad Yadav.
 27 April, 2 May and 7 May – In general elections the ruling Congress Party is defeated and Bharatiya Janata Party becomes the largest single party in parliament. Phoolan Devi, former bandit queen is elected to Parliament from the Samajwadi Party.
 17 to 28 May – Atal Bihari Vajpayee, leader of the Bharatiya Janata Party, is elected the new Prime Minister of India, replacing P. V. Narasimha Rao of the Indian National Congress. However, the party does not receive an overall majority and Vajpayee resigns thirteen days later rather than face a no confidence vote, and is replaced by the United Front, led by Deve Gowda. 
 1 June – Deve Gowda is sworn in as the head of the United Front, a coalition of 13 parties which Congress supported but did not join. Gowda's new cabinet brings in powerful regional figures, mixing low-caste and Muslim leaders with veterans of the socialist movement.
 28 June – Communists join the government for the first time since independence.
 11 July – A Delhi court summons Congress president P.V. Narasimha Rao to testify as the co-accused in a cheating case.
 28 August – At least 194 pilgrims are reported to have frozen to death in northern Kashmir after being stranded by violent rain and snow storms in the Amarnath Yatra tragedy.
 19 September – The government of Gujarat under Chief Minister Suresh Mehta is sacked on recommendation of Prime Minister Gowda, and federal rule is imposed over the state. The move comes a day after the BJP government in Gujarat won a controversial vote of confidence in the state legislature. Mehta won the vote after the acting assembly speaker (a BJP member) suspended all opposition legislators. Fighting broke out on the floor of the assembly after marshals tried to force the suspended legislators to leave. Witnesses said lawmakers hurled pin cushions and microphones at each other. Several lawmakers and journalists were reportedly injured in the scuffles.
 22 September – Rao resigns as president of the Congress Party.
 23 September – Sitaram Kesri is elected Congress president.
 10 October – Rao is arrested on fresh charges of forgery.
 11 October – An Uttar Pradesh state election returns a hung assembly; the local power struggle sharpens conflicts between Congress and coalition parties at national level.
 30 October – Michael Jackson arrived in Mumbai as a part of his History World Tour and he performed for the first time ever in India in front of 66,000 fans on 1 November 1996 at Andheri Sports Complex.
 7 November – A devastating Category 4 Cyclone strikes Andhra Pradesh, India. The storm surge sweeps fishing villages out to sea, over 2,000 people die. 95% of the crops are completely destroyed.
 12 November – A Saudi Arabian Boeing 747 jumbo jet and a Kazakhstan Ilyushin cargo plane collide near Charkhi Dadri, killing 349 people in the world's deadliest mid-air collision.
 28 November – Chinese President Jiang Zemin begins his three-day visit, the first visit by a Chinese head of state to India.
 19 December – Rao resigns as Congress parliamentary leader, his last official party position.
 30 December – In the Indian state of Assam, a passenger train is bombed by Bodo separatists, killing 26.

Law

Births
1 January Danish khan
6 January 
 Kishan Shrikanth, actor and director.
 Harmanpreet Singh, hockey player
7 January – Helly Shah, actress 
18 February – Anupama Parameswaran, actress. 
17 March - Rutuja Bhosale, tennis player and Kanchi Singh, actress
05 April  Rashmika Mandanna, actress
11 May – Fanai Lalrempuia, footballer
19 May – Lakshmi Menon, actress
22 May – Akhil Rabindra, racing driver
27 June – Tanay Chheda, actor
3 July – Jyothi Surekha Vennam, archer
18 July – Smriti Mandhana, cricketer
28 August – Aanchal Thakur, competitor
19 September - Namitha Pramod, actress
2 November - Sumedh Mudgalkar, actor, dancer

14 November – Hiba Nawab, actress

Deaths
18 January – N. T. Rama Rao, actor, director, producer, and politician (born 1923).
3 July – Raaj Kumar, actor (born 1926).
29 July – Aruna Asaf Ali, independence fighter (born 1909).

Full date unknown
P. K. Venugopalan Nambiar, agricultural scientist (born 1924).

See also 
 Bollywood films of 1996

References

 
India
Years of the 20th century in India
India
1990s in India